Juhn Guang Liou is a Taiwanese geologist.

Liou attended Hsinchu Senior High School and National Taiwan University, where he worked as a research assistant to Academia Sinica member V. C. Juan alongside high school classmate Bor-ming Jahn. Liou earned a doctorate from the University of California, Los Angeles, and joined the Stanford University faculty in 1972. In 1978, Liou was named a fellow of the Mineralogical Society of America and awarded a Guggenheim Fellowship. The Geological Society of America granted Liou fellowship in 1979. He retired from Stanford in 2005, and was awarded the Roebling Medal in 2011.

References

Living people
Taiwanese expatriates in the United States
National Taiwan University alumni
University of California, Los Angeles alumni
Stanford University faculty
Fellows of the Geological Society of America
Taiwanese geologists
Year of birth missing (living people)
People from Hsinchu